Michael "Mikey" Maher (15 July 1869 – 18 May 1947) was an Irish hurler who played as a centre-forward for the Tipperary senior team.

Born in Tubberadora, County Tipperary, Maher first arrived on the inter-county scene at the age of twenty-five when he made his senior debut in the 1895 championship. Maher went on to play a key part for Tipperary in what was a hugely successful era, and won five All-Ireland medals and five Munster medals. Maher was the first player to captain a team to All-Ireland success on three occasions.

At club level Maher won three championship medals with Tubberadora.

Maher's retirement came following the conclusion of the 1904 championship.

Biography

Mikey Maher was born in Tubberadora, County Tipperary in 1870.  He was educated at the local national school and later worked on the family farm.

Maher was the second eldest in a family of four boys, all of whom had a great interest in the game of hurling.  Maher's older brother, Jack, won two All-Ireland medals in the 1890s.  Two of Maher's nephews, Sonny Maher and Michael Maher, won All-Ireland medals with Tipperary in the 1950s and 1960s.

In retirement from hurling Maher returned to working on the family farm. In 1918 he moved to a farm in Galbally, County Limerick where he spent the rest of his life.

Mikey Maher died in 1947.

Playing career

Club

Maher played his club hurling with his local Tubberadora club and enjoyed much success.  He won senior county championship titles with the club in 1895, 1896 and 1898.  Tubberadora never again won another senior county title.

Inter-county

Maher first came to prominence on the inter-county scene with Tipperray in 1890.  Cork, however, were the standard bearers in the province of Munster at the time.  In 1895 Maher was selected to captain the Tipperary senior hurling team.  That year Tipp faced Limerick in the provincial final and the game turned into a rout.  Tipperary won the game by 7-8 to 0-2 giving Maher his first Munster title.  Tipperary later played Kilkenny in the All-Ireland final to be played at what is now Croke Park.  Tipp took a 1-6 to 1-0 lead at half-time and went on to hammer ‘the Cats’ by 6-8 to 1-10 at the final whistle.  Tipperary's Paddy Riordan is said to have scored all but one point of his team's total as Maher collected his first All-Ireland title.

Maher was captain again in 1896 as Tipperary played Cork in the Munster final.  That game had to end before the official finish and a replay took place.  Tipp easily won the replay by 7-9 to 2-3.  The subsequent All-Ireland final saw Tipperary play Dublin at the famous Jones's Road ground.  Tipp scored a goal in the very first minute and took a 4-6 to 0-1 lead at half-time.  The game turned into a rout as Tipperary won by 8-14 to 0-4 giving Maher a second All-Ireland title.  This game still holds the record as the most one-sided All-Ireland final.

Tipp surrendered their provincial crown in 1897, however, the team took on Cork in the 1898 Munster final.  That game had to be abandoned due to fading light, however, Maher collected a third provincial title as Tipp easily defeated ‘the Rebels’ in the replay.  Galway fell heavily in the penultimate game of the championship, allowing Tipp to advance to the All-Ireland final against Kilkenny.  In a high-scoring and exciting game Kilkenny were on top for the first twenty-five minutes.  In the second-half Tipp took the upper hand with Maher scoring three goals.  A 7-13 to 3-10 score line gave Tipp the victory and gave Maher a third All-Ireland title as captain.

1899 saw Tipperary defeat Clare in the provincial decider giving Maher his fourth Munster title.  It was another rout as the 5-16 to 0-8 score line suggests.  This victory allowed Maher's team to advance directly to the All-Ireland final where Wexford provided the opposition.  Wexford held Tipp for the first fifteen minutes; however, they still took a 2-6 to 1-3 lead at half-time.  Maher's side went on the rampage in the second half and finished with a score of 3-12 to 1-4.  The Wexford team walked off the field with ten minutes left in the game because they couldn't find a substitute for an injured player.  Tipp were awarded the title and Maher collected his fourth All-Ireland title.

In 1900 Tipperary trounced Kerry by 6-11 to 1-9 in the provincial final, giving Maher his fifth Munster title.  Tipp later narrowly defeated Kilkenny in the All-Ireland semi-final before trouncing Galway in the ‘home’ All-Ireland final.  This was not the end of the championship campaign because, for the first year ever, the ‘home’ finalists had to take on London in the real All-Ireland final.  The game was a close affair with both sides level at 0-5 with eight minutes to go.  London then took the lead; however, they later conceded a free.  Maher stepped up, took the free and a forward ‘charge’ carried the sliothar over the line.  Tipp scored another goal following a weak puck out and claimed the victory.  It was Maher's fifth and final All-Ireland title.  He retired from inter-county hurling shortly afterwards.

Teams

External links
 Munster final winning teams
 Tipperary GAA honours

1869 births
1947 deaths
Tubberadora hurlers
Tipperary inter-county hurlers
All-Ireland Senior Hurling Championship winners